The Saga Continues is a compilation album by American rap ensemble Wu-Tang Clan, produced by long-time producer Mathematics released on October 13, 2017 on eOne. The group name was shortened to  "Wu-Tang" to mark the fact that the album features all Wu-Tang Clan members except U-God due to his legal issues with the group over royalties. It also features guest appearances from Streetlife, Redman, Sean Price and others. Producer Mathematics has explained, "It's a Wu-Tang record of course, [but] it can't be a complete Wu-Tang Clan album without [U-God]."

The Saga Continues was promoted with two singles, "People Say" and "Lesson Learn'd", both featuring Redman. The album debuted on at number 15 on Billboard 200 chart and at number one on Independent Albums having sold 19,461 copies in the first week, and including streams it was 24,613 copies.

Background 
After releasing A Better Tomorrow, the group continued to work on their solo albums: Ghostface Killah released his sequel to Twelve Reasons to Die and collaboration album Sour Soul with BadBadNotGood, Method Man released The Meth Lab, Inspectah Deck put out two albums with his side group Czarface. Masta Killa kept on working his fourth album entitled Loyalty Is Royalty which eventually was released on September 29, 2017.

Meanwhile, Wu-Tang Clan's most controversial album, Once Upon a Time in Shaolin, was sold to Martin Shkreli for $2,000,000.

On August 25, 2017, without any announcement, a track called "People Say" was released stating that it was a new single off Wu-Tang Clan's upcoming album. A few days later, RZA announced that the new project would be entitled The Saga Continues and would be entirely "crafted by" Wu-Tang Clan DJ, Mathematics. In the later interview he commented:
 On September 22, 2017, the second single, "Lesson Learn'd", was released, and on October 4, a video for "People Say" was published on Wu-Tang Clan Vevo YouTube account.

Critical reception 

Upon its release, The Saga Continues received mixed to positive reviews from most music critics. At Metacritic, which assigns a normalized rating out of 100 to reviews from mainstream critics, the album received an average score of 64, based on 16 reviews, which indicates "generally favorable reviews". AllMusic's reviewer, who gave the album 3 out of 5 stars, stated that "Mathematics fills The Saga Continues with dark, moody beats, atmospheric keyboard patches, snatches of classic soul sides, and samples from vintage kung-fu movies. If this isn't quite a brother to Enter the Wu-Tang (36 Chambers)". Alex McLevy of The A.V. Club rated the album a "B−" calling it more "cobbled-together" than A Better Tomorrow, but also stated that "it turns out to be the best Wu-related effort since 2010’s thin yet enjoyable Wu-Massacre". He also praised Mathematics' production saying that he "has been intricately involved with the Wu since its inception […] and he turns out to do a better RZA than the RZA these days, stitching together more than an hour of trilling violins, head-snap drums, and mawkish hooks". Will Rosebury of Clash Music, rated The Saga Continues a 6 out of 10 stating that "at its best, 'The Saga Continues' captures some of the old Wu magic but unfortunately these moments are few and far between".

Gary Suarez of Consequence of Sound gave that album a "C+" and wrote that "while The Saga Continues engenders enough wistful reminiscences to satisfy the core, it provides shockingly little in the way of memorable moments". Writing for The 405, Chase McMullen rated it 5.5 out of 10, pointing out that "Mathematics’ efforts are admirable, he hoes his damnedest to recreate a classic Wu vibe, but the whole presentation is gilded, the rappers themselves largely going through the motions". Justin Ivy of HipHopDX rated that album 3.6 out of 5 claiming that "this compilation gives listeners enjoyable music from the Wu-Tang tree that rightfully exists outside of the official album canon". Zachary Hoskins of Slant Magazine gave the album 2½ out of 5 stars and commended that "Enjoying this album will depend on your tolerance for Wu-Tang at its most generic" and rebuked the album saying that "the result is consistent but unambitious".

Track listing 
All songs produced by Mathematics.

Charts

References 

2017 albums
Wu-Tang Clan albums
Albums produced by RZA
Albums produced by Mathematics
MNRK Music Group albums